Valjean McCarty Hessing (August 30, 1934 – October 7, 2006) was a Choctaw painter, who worked in the Bacone flatstyle. Throughout her career, she won 9- awards for her work and was designated a Master Artist by the Five Civilized Tribes Museum in 1976. Her artworks are in collections of the Heard Museum of Phoenix, Arizona; the Philbrook Museum of Art in Tulsa, Oklahoma; the Southern Plains Indian Museum in Anadarko, Oklahoma; and the Wheelwright Museum of the American Indian of Santa Fe, New Mexico, among others.

Early life
Valjean McCarty was born on August 30, 1934, in Tulsa, Oklahoma to Madelyn Helen (née Beck) and Vernon Clay McCarty. Her family were members of the Choctaw Nation and she was the oldest of four siblings, Carol Jean "Jane", Patrick, and Judy Louise. Her father was a plumber and an honorary tribal leader. Because he often had to travel for work, given that in-door plumbing was still uncommon, Valjean was raised in Tulsa in the home of her maternal grandparents, Sada and Fred Beck, who were of Welch ancestry. Her paternal grandparents, were Etta Regina (née Davis), who was Choctaw and Carl McCarty.

In grade school, McCarty wanted to become an artist, but when her father asked a local well-known artist where she and Jane could study painting, he was told that women could not be painters. Hessing felt that it was important to keep the tradition alive. To make the work accurate, Native artists were required to do research to accurately portray the story of a custom or historic event meticulously reproducing garments, motifs, and themes. She sought to capture the wide spectrum of complexions among people and typically painted scenes of Choctaw daily life or focused on historic images and legends of her people.

In 1962, Hessing returned to painting and began entering art exhibits like the Scottsdale National Indian Art Exhibition (1962) in Arizona, the U.S. Department of Interior Art exhibition (1964) in Washington, DC, the Tulsa Council of Indians Exhibition (1965), and the Second Annual Invitational Exhibition of American Indian Paintings (1965) in Washington, DC. In 1966 at the Philbrook Indian Annual, Hessing placed second, behind Joan Hill (Muscogee Creek/Cherokee, 1930–2020), the first woman designated as a "Master Artist" by the Five Civilized Tribes Museum. In 1971, Hessing won first prize for painting in the Scottsdale Exhibition's 10th Annual and the following year was the Choctaw Heritage Award winner at the Five Civilized Tribes Museum in Muskogee, Oklahoma. She often exhibited her works with her sister Jane, the Heard Museum of Phoenix produced an exhibition featuring the two women in 1972. The following year, the Philbrook selected Hessing's work for a solo exhibition. In 1973, when her husband was appointed as director of research and development at Amoco, the family relocated to Naperville, Illinois.

In 1976, Hessing earned the distinction of "Master Artist" from the Five Civilized Tribes Museum. The designation is the highest honor bestowed by the museum and through 2008 only 35 artists had earned the distinction. Among her contemporaries, who had earned the distinction at the time of her recognition were Troy Anderson (Cherokee of Northeastern Alabama), Bob Bell (Choctaw Nation), Enoch Kelly Haney (Seminole/Muscogee Creek), Joan Hill (Muscogee Creek/Cherokee), Saint Clair Homer II (Choctaw Nation), Bert Seabourn, Jason Stone, and Willard Stone. In 1978, Hessing was honored by the Heard Museum with the Popovi Da Memorial and won the Pierce-Avery Memorial Award for her work Removal to Indian Territory. She won the Pierce-Avery Memorial Award a second time in 1980 and that year had a solo exhibit in Washington, DC, at Via Gambaro Gallery.

Hessing was one of the featured artists who exhibited in 1983 at the Mary B. Rogers Gallery of the Millicent Rogers Museum in Taos, New Mexico. The following year, her family returned to Tulsa, when her husband was appointed to head Amoco's Computing Research Division. In 1985, she participated along with her sister Jane and Mary Adair (Cherokee Nation), Jean Bales (Iowa), Joan Brown, Sharron Ahtone Harjo (Kiowa), Ruthe Blalock Jones (Shawnee/Peoria), and Virginia Stroud (Keetoowah Band Cherokee/Muscogee Creek) in the Daughters of the Earth exhibition which traveled for three years (1985–1988), touring in the United States and Europe. Throughout her career, she won 90 honors for her paintings, which included nine grand awards.

Death and legacy
When Hessing's husband retired in the early 1990s, the couple moved to Onarga, Illinois. There she died on October 7, 2006.

The U.S. Department of the Interior has preserved her works in two collections — Amerindian Circle and Indian Arts and Crafts Board, both located in Washington, DC. She also has works in the permanent collections of the Heard Museum of Phoenix; the Philbrook Museum in Tulsa; the Southeast Missouri State University Museum at Cape Girardeau, Missouri; the Southern Plains Indian Museum in Anadarko, Oklahoma; and the Wheelwright Museum in Santa Fe, as well as in private collections.  In 2008, the Institute of American Indian Arts hosted a retrospective of her works, Valjean McCarty Hessing Honored, and her painting The Black Hat was featured on the cover of The Santa Fe New Mexican's issue of February 1, 2008. In 2012, her work Some Died along the Way (1969) was one of the pieces exhibited from the James T. Bialac Native American Art Collection acquired by the Fred Jones Jr. Museum of Art in Norman, Oklahoma. In 2019, she was among the women artists featured in the Five Civilized Tribes Museum's Women of the Five Civilized Tribes Exhibit.

Notes

References

Citations

Bibliography

 and 

1934 births
2006 deaths
Artists from Tulsa, Oklahoma
University of Mary Hardin–Baylor alumni
University of Tulsa alumni
Choctaw Nation of Oklahoma people
Native American women artists
20th-century American women artists
21st-century American women artists
21st-century American painters
20th-century American painters
Native American painters
American women painters
Painters from Oklahoma
20th-century Native Americans
21st-century Native Americans
20th-century Native American women
21st-century Native American women